The Canadian territory of Nunavut was formed on April 1, 1999 through the Nunavut Act and the Nunavut Land Claims Agreement Act. Nunavut, since its formation, has had a consensus government. In a consensus government, the premier is elected by the non-partisan members of the Legislative Assembly. Prior to April 1, 1999, the land that Nunavut occupies was part of the Northwest Territories.

History

The territory's first premier, Paul Okalik, was elected after the 1999 general elections. He was re-elected to a second term after the 2004 general elections. Although Okalik was re-elected to a third term after the 2008 general elections in the Iqaluit West riding, he was defeated by newly elected MLA Eva Aariak in the premiership vote on November 14. On 15 November, 2013, Peter Taptuna beat out Paul Okalik and Paul Quassa for the position of premier.

Premiers of Nunavut

See also
Premier of Nunavut
List of Nunavut general elections
Legislative Assembly of Nunavut

References
General

 

Specific

External links
 Government of Nunavut

Nunavut
Politics of Nunavut
Nunavut-related lists
Lists of people from Nunavut